Buddhadeb is a given name. Notable people with the name include:

Buddhadeb Bhattacharjee (born 1944), Indian politician and a member of the politburo of the Communist Party of India
Buddhadeb Bosu (1908–1974), Indian Bengali writer of the 20th century
Buddhadeb Dasgupta (1944–2021), Indian poet and prominent contemporary filmmaker
Buddhadeb Guha (1936–2021), popular Bengali fiction writer